Health Protection and Medical Care (Seafarers) Convention, 1987 is  an International Labour Organization Convention.

It was established in 1987, with the preamble stating:
Having decided upon the adoption of certain proposals with regard to health protection and medical care for seafarers,...

Ratifications 
As of 2022, the convention has been ratified by 15 states. Of the ratifying states, twelve have subsequently denounced the treaty.

Revision
The principles of the convention were revised and incorporated into the Maritime Labour Convention.

External links 
Text.
Ratifications.

Health treaties
International Labour Organization conventions
Treaties entered into force in 1991
Treaties concluded in 1987
Treaties of Brazil
Treaties of Czechoslovakia
Treaties of the Czech Republic
Treaties of Germany
Treaties of the Hungarian People's Republic
Treaties of Italy
Treaties of Mexico
Treaties of Slovakia
Treaties of Turkey
Admiralty law treaties
Occupational safety and health treaties
1987 in labor relations